The Paper Lads is a children's television series produced by Tyne Tees Television and broadcast nationally from 1977 to 1979.  It was set in the northern industrial city of Newcastle upon Tyne, although much of the series was filmed in Gateshead, and recounted the adventures of a group of newspaper delivery boys and a girl.

There were two series made, each of seven episodes. William Corlett's four scripts for the series won him the Writer's Guild Award for Best Children's Writer.

The signature tune of the series, "Back Home Once Again", was performed by progressive rock band Renaissance, and it appears (re-recorded) as a full-length song on their 1978 album A Song for All Seasons.

The full series was released on DVD by Network in July 2013.

Two novels by William Humble based on the series were released by children's paperback publisher Target Books.

References

External links

1977 British television series debuts
1979 British television series endings
1970s British children's television series
ITV children's television shows
Television shows set in Tyne and Wear
Television shows set in Newcastle upon Tyne
Television series by ITV Studios
English-language television shows
Television shows produced by Tyne Tees Television